St David's Hospital may refer to:

 St David's Hospital, Cardiff, in Cardiff, Wales, UK
 St David's Hospital, Carmarthen, in Carmarthen, Wales, a former mental health hospital
 Dewi Sant Hospital, a small hospital in Pontypridd, Wales, UK
 St David's Hospital, Hancock, Austin, Texas, USA